This article is a list of volcanic eruptions of approximately magnitude 6 or more on the Volcanic Explosivity Index (VEI) or equivalent sulfur dioxide emission during the Holocene, and Pleistocene eruptions of the Decade Volcanoes (Avachinsky-Koryaksky, Kamchatka; Colima, Trans-Mexican Volcanic Belt; Mount Etna, Sicily; Galeras, Andes, Northern Volcanic Zone; Mauna Loa, Hawaii; Mount Merapi, Central Java; Mount Nyiragongo, East African Rift; Mount Rainier, Washington; Sakurajima, Kagoshima Prefecture; Santamaria/ Santiaguito, Central America Volcanic Arc; Santorini, Cyclades; Taal Volcano, Luzon Volcanic Arc; Teide, Canary Islands; Ulawun, New Britain; Mount Unzen, Nagasaki Prefecture; Mount Vesuvius, Naples); Campania, Italy; South Aegean Volcanic Arc; Laguna de Bay, Luzon Volcanic Arc; Mount Pinatubo, Luzon Volcanic Arc; Toba, Sunda Arc; Mount Meager massif, Garibaldi Volcanic Belt; Yellowstone hotspot, Wyoming; and Taupō Volcanic Zone, greater than VEI 4.

The eruptions in the Holocene on the link: Holocene Volcanoes in Kamchatka were not added yet, but they are listed on the Peter L. Ward's supplemental table. Some of the eruptions are not listed on the Global Volcanism Program timetable as well, at least not as VEI 6. The timetables of Global Volcanism Program; Bristlecone pine tree-rings (Pinus longaeva, Pinus aristata, Pinus ponderosa, Pinus edulis, Pseudotsuga menziesii); the 4 ka Yamal Peninsula Siberian larch (Larix sibirica) chronology; the 7 ka Scots pine (Pinus sylvestris) chronology from Finnish Lapland; GISP2 ice core; GRIP ice core; Dye 3 ice core; Bipolar comparison; Antarctic ice core (Bunder and Cole-Dai, 2003); Antarctic ice core (Cole-Dai et al., 1997); Crête ice core, in central Greenland,  benthic foraminifera in deep sea sediment cores (Lisiecki, Raymo 2005), do not agree with each other sometimes. The 536–547 AD dust-veil event might be an impact event.

Holocene eruptions 

The Holocene epoch begins 11,700 years BP, (10 000 14C years ago)

Since 2000 AD

1000–2000 AD

1 to 1000 AD

Before the Common Era (BC/BCE)

Pleistocene eruptions 
2.588 ± 0.005 million years BP, the Quaternary period and Pleistocene epoch begin.

Notes 

Iceland has four volcanic zones: Reykjanes (Mid-Atlantic Ridge), West and North Volcanic Zones (RVZ, WVZ, NVZ) and the East Volcanic Zone (EVZ). The Mid-Iceland Belt (MIB) connects them across central Iceland. There are two intraplate belts too (Öræfajökull (ÖVB) and Snæfellsnes (SVB)).
Iceland's East Volcanic Zone: the central volcanoes of Vonarskard and Hágöngur belong to the same volcanic system; this also applies to Bárðarbunga and Hamarinn, and Grímsvötn and Þórðarhyrna.
Laki is part of a volcanic system, centering on the Grímsvötn volcano (Long NE-SW-trending fissure systems, including Laki, extend from the central volcano).
The Eldgjá canyon and the Katla volcano form another volcanic system. Although the Eldgjá canyon and the Laki fissure are very near from each other, lava from the Katla and the Hekla volcanic systems result in transitional alkalic basalts and lava from the central volcanoes result in tholeiitic basalts.
The central volcano of Bárðarbunga, the Veidivötn and Trollagigar fissures form one volcanic system, which extend about 100 km SW to near Torfajökull volcano and 50 km NE to near Askja volcano, respectively. The subglacial Loki-Fögrufjöll volcanic system located SW of Bárðarbunga volcano is also part of the Bárðarbunga volcanic system and contains two subglacial ridges extending from the largely subglacial Hamarinn central volcano (15 km southwest of Bárðarbunga); the Loki ridge trends to the NE and the Fögrufjöll ridge to the SW.
New Zealand, North Island, Taupō Volcanic Zone:
The following Volcanic Centers belong to the Taupō Volcanic Zone: Rotorua, Ōkataina, Maroa, Taupō, Tongariro and Mangakino. It includes Mangakino volcano, Reporoa Caldera, Mount Tarawera, Mount Ruapehu, Mount Tongariro and Whakaari / White Island.  The Taupō Volcanic Zone forms a southern portion of the active Lau-Havre-Taupō back-arc basin, which lies behind the Kermadec-Tonga subduction zone (Hikurangi Trough – Kermadec Trench – Tonga Trench). Some lakes in the area: Taupo, Rotorua, Rotomahana, and Rerewhakaaitu. Lake Ōkataina, Lake Tarawera, Lake Rotokakahi (Green Lake), Lake Tikitapu (Blue Lake), Lake Okareka, and Lake Rotoiti lie within the Ōkataina Caldera.
Taupō Volcanic Zone, the Mangakino Volcanic Center is the westernmost and oldest rhyolitic caldera volcano in the Taupō Volcanic Zone. Mangakino is a town too.
Taupō Volcanic Zone, Maroa Volcanic Center. The Maroa Caldera formed in the Northeast corner of the Whakamaru Caldera. The Whakamaru Caldera partially overlaps with the Taupō Caldera on the South. The Orakeikorako, Ngatamariki, Rotokaua, and Wairakei hydrothermal areas are located within or adjacent to the Whakamaru caldera. Whakamaru is a town too.
The oldest volcanic zone in the North Island is the Northland Region, then the Coromandel Volcanic Zone (CVZ), then the Mangakino caldera complex and the Kapenga Caldera and then the rest of the Taupō Volcanic Zone (TVZ).
Santorini, South Aegean Volcanic Arc. The southern Aegean is one of the most rapidly deforming regions of the Himalayan-Alpine mountain belt (Alpide belt).
The twin volcanoes of Nindirí and Masaya lie within the massive Pleistocene Las Sierras pyroclastic shield volcano.
There are two peaks in the Colima volcano complex: Nevado de Colima (4,330 m), which is older and inactive, lies 5 km north of the younger and very active 3,860 m Volcán de Colima (also called Volcán de Fuego de Colima).
The largely submarine Kuwae Caldera cuts the flank of the Late Pleistocene or Holocene Tavani Ruru volcano, the submarine volcano Karua lies near the northern rim of Kuwae Caldera.
Bismarck volcanic arc, the Rabaul Caldera includes the sub-vent of Tavurvur and the sub-vent of Vulcan.
Bismarck volcanic arc, Pago volcano, New Britain, Papua New Guinea, is a young post-caldera cone within the Witori Caldera. The Buru Caldera cuts the SW flank of the Witori volcano.
Sakurajima, Kyūshū, Japan, is a volcano of the Aira Caldera.
The Mount Unzen volcanic complex, East of Nagasaki, Japan, comprises three large stratovolcanoes with complex structures, Kinugasa on the North, Fugen-dake at the East-center, and Kusenbu on the South.

Nomenclature 
Each state/ country seem to have a slightly different approach, but there is an order:
 Craton, and then Province as sections or regions of a craton.
 First: volcanic arc, volcanic belt and volcanic zone.
 Second: volcanic area, caldera cluster and caldera complex.
 Third: volcanic field, volcanic system and volcanic center.
 A volcanic field is a localized area of the Earth's crust that is prone to localized volcanic activity.
 A volcanic group (aka a volcanic complex) is a collection of related volcanoes or volcanic landforms.
 Neutral: volcanic cluster and volcanic locus.

In the Basin and Range Province the volcanic fields are nested. The McDermit volcanic field, is also named Orevada rift volcanic field. The Latir-Questa volcanic locus and the Taos Plateau volcanic field seem to be in a similar area. The Southwest Nevada volcanic field, the Crater Flat-Lunar Crater volcanic zone, the Central Nevada volcanic field, the Indian Peak volcanic field and the Marysvale volcanic field seem to have no transition between each other; the Ocate volcanic field is also known as the Mora volcanic field; and the Red Hill volcanic field is also known as Quemado volcanic field.

References

External links 

Quaternary volcanic eruptions
Volcanic events by period